Sunday Chibuke Ikeji (born 2 July 1982) is a former Nigerian footballer who played as a midfielder.

Career
He began his career at Lobi Stars F.C., before moving to Al Ahly in 2000 and became famous for scoring a goal against Real Madrid on 4 August 2001. In January 2004, he signed a contract for NK Ljubljana in Slovenia. He played in Ljubljana for 1 year and then signed for NK MIK CM Celje in 2005, in which he has scored one goal in 12 games. He left Celje in 2006 and joined another Slovenian club, NK Domžale, making 10 appearances and scored 1 goal. He moved to FC Koper in July 2007. He played 30 games and scored 4 goals and was loaned out from his team in January 2009 to NK Bela Krajina Črnomelj. After returning to FC Koper in January 2010, he was sold to Đồng Tháp F.C. in the V-League.

National team
Sunday played one match for the Nigerian national team in 2000.

References

External links
 FC Koper Profile
 Stats from Slovenia at PrvaLiga.

1983 births
Living people
Nigerian footballers
Nigeria international footballers
Nigerian expatriate footballers
Association football defenders
Lobi Stars F.C. players
Al Ahly SC players
Nigerian expatriate sportspeople in Egypt
Expatriate footballers in Egypt
Expatriate soccer players in the United States
Nigerian expatriate sportspeople in the United States
NK Celje players
NK Domžale players
NK Ljubljana players
Expatriate footballers in Slovenia
Nigerian expatriate sportspeople in Slovenia
Expatriate footballers in Vietnam
Nigerian expatriate sportspeople in Vietnam
Dong Thap FC players
Egyptian Premier League players